Symphony No.1: What Happened When I Was Asleep is the fifth solo album by Svoy. It was released on June 23, 2015, on Songs of Universal/Universal Music Group, Inc. The album was in production for over 5 years during which Svoy created 10 new selections, including original cover of The Beatles' classic "The Long and Winding Road" and Adam Levy's "I Shot Her Down". PopMatters' Brice Ezell described it as "...A brooding and knotty piece of music, one whose serpentine flow evades easy comprehension", EDM Assassin's Nick Pesavento suggested "...You will not be able to pull your headphones out" and YourEDM's Timmy Kusnierek wrote "...It's a beautifully avant-garde collection that incorporates the gamut of genres, including breakbeat, dub, neoclassical, ambient, and more. The ten tracks of the album escalate in intensity, each more pensive and introspective than the last".

Track listing

Personnel 
 Svoy – keyboards, vocals, spoken word, producer, programming, vocal arrangement, sound engineering, mixing, mastering, art direction, design

Release history

References 

2015 albums
Svoy albums